Prahlada is an asura king in Hindu mythology. He is known for his staunch devotion towards the preserver deity, Vishnu. He appears in the narrative of Narasimha, the man-lion avatar of Vishnu, who rescues Prahlada by slaying his wicked father, Hiranyakashipu.

Prahlada is described as a saintly boy, known for his innocence and bhakti to Vishnu. Despite the abusive nature of his father, Hiranyakashipu, he continues to worship Vishnu. He is considered to be a mahājana, or great devotee, by followers of Vaishnava traditions. A treatise is accredited to him in the Bhagavata Purana, in which Prahlada describes the process of his loving worship towards Vishnu. 

The majority of stories in the Puranas regarding him are based on the activities of Prahlada as a young boy, and he is usually depicted as such in paintings and illustrations.

Legend 
Prahlada was born to Kayadhu and Hiranyakashipu, an evil daitya king who had been granted a boon that he could not be killed off by anything born from a living womb, neither be killed by a man nor an animal, neither during the day nor at night, neither indoors nor outdoors, neither on land nor in the air nor in water and of no man-made weapon. However, after repeated attempts of filicide by Hiranyakashipu unto Prahlada, Prahlada was finally saved by Narasimha, the fourth avatar of Vishnu, who descended to demonstrate the quality of divine rage and redemption by killing the demon king. The word "Narsimha" is derived from the Sanskrit words "nara", meaning man, and "siṃha", meaning lion. Thus, the preserver god took the form of a part-man, part-lion to kill the asura.

After the death of his father, Prahlada ascended the asura throne, and ruled peacefully and virtuously. He was known for his generosity and kindness. He sowed similar seeds in his son Virochana, and grandson Mahabali.

Early life

When the ruler of the asuras, Hiraṇyakashipu, was performing a penance in the forest to gain the boon of destroying Vishnu, the devas attacked the asura realm. A great battle ensued, in which the devas were defeated. While fleeing, Indra abducted the pregnant Kayādhū, the wife of Hiranyakashipu, as a spoil of war. Narada listened to the wails of the poor woman, and got her released from Indra’s captivity. She stayed in the ashrama of the divine sage in gratitude. Prahlada — while being inside his mother's womb — listened to Narada's chants of devotion towards Narayana. He was taught by Narada during his early childhood. As a result, he grew devoted to Vishnu. His father was antagonised by his spiritual inclination, and tried to warn Prahlada against offending him, since he had greatly desired to turn his son against Vishnu in particular. Despite several warnings from his father Hiranyakashipu, Prahlada continued to worship Vishnu instead of the former. The child is successful in converting other students of the asura clan into Vaishnavism by teaching them the Narayana mantra. His father then decided to commit filicide and poisoned Prahlada, but he survived. When the daitya soldiers attacked their prince with weapons, Prahlada informed them that their efforts were futile, since Vishnu resided within them. The asura monarch then had the boy trampled by the aṣṭadiggajas, the eight elephants who bear the weight of the earth, but their tusks were broken to bits upon contact with him. He placed Prahlada in a room with venomous, dark snakes, and they made a bed for him with their bodies.

Prahalada was then thrown from a valley into a river, but was saved by Bhudevi, the consort of Vishnu. Holika, the sister of Hiranyakashipu, was blessed in that she could not be hurt by fire. Hiranyakashipu put Prahlada on the lap of Holika as she sat on a pyre. Prahlada prayed to Vishnu to keep him safe. Holika burnt to death, even as Prahlada was left unscathed. This event is celebrated as the Hindu festival of Holi. 

The asura Shambara and Vayu were tasked to slay the prince, but both of them were driven away by Vishnu. The boy was entrusted to Shukra, who educated him regarding his duties, the sciences, and justice, and was returned to his father after he was deemed to have become humble. The asura king once again broached the topic of God with his son, only to discover that the latter had never wavered in his faith. Finally, the wicked daitya commanded all the daityas and the danavas to collect all the mountains of the earth to construct a barrier over the boy in the ocean, so that his son would be submerged for a millennium. Even though they spread over him for a thousand miles, Prahlada, bound hand and foot, prayed to Vishnu, who granted him a number of boons, and returned to prostrate before his father, who was left bewildered.
 
After tolerating repeated abuse from Hiranyakashipu, Prahlada is eventually saved by Narasimha, an avatar of Vishnu in the form of a man-lion, emerges from within a stone pillar, who places the king on his thighs, and kills him with his sharp nails at the threshold to his home at dusk, thus nullifying all of Hiranyakashipu's boon of virtual immortality.

Prahlada eventually becomes the king of the daityas, and attains a place in the abode of Vishnu (Vaikuntha) after his death.

Literature 

In the Bhagavad Gita (10.30) Krishna makes the following statement in regard to Prahlada, showing his favour towards him:
Translation: "Among the Daityas, I am the great devotee Prahlada and of calculators, I am Time; among quadrupeds, I am the lion; and among birds, I am Garuda."

In the Vishnu Purana, the sage Parasara ends narrating the tale of Prahlada to Maitreya with the following proclamation:

Later life

Conquest of the three worlds 
Because of his steadfast devotion towards Vishnu as well as under the teachings of Shukracharya, Prahlada became the mighty King of the Asuras. Prahlada was even more powerful than his father, Hiranyakashipu ever was. He enjoyed the love and respect of his subjects. Without lifting a single weapon, and by virtue of his good behaviour, Prahlada conquered the three worlds easily, and Indra ran away from Svarga. In the disguise of a Brahmin, Indra sought an audience with the asura king and asked him to teach him about Sanatana Dharma. Pleased with this pupil, he offered him a boon, and Indra sought the king's virtue, and hence robbed Prahlada of his dharma as well.

Duel against Nara-Narayana 
Prahlada once commanded the asuras to accompany him to the holy tirtha of Naimiṣa, where he hoped to see a vision of Vishnu. They went hunting along the banks of the Sarasvati river. Prahlada observed two ascetics with matted hair, bearing the bows of Sharanga and Ajagava. The asura king asked them why they held weapons while performing a penance, and the two ascetics responded that all those who held power were righteous in their conduct. One of the rishis assured the king that none in the three worlds could conquer them in a duel. Prahlada rose to the challenge. Nara fired arrows upon the king with his Ajagava, but the latter was able to defeat him with his own gold-plated arrows. Prahlada employed the divine Brahmastra against Nara's Narayanastra. Seeing them neutralised in a mid-air collision, Prahlada wielded his mace against Narayana. His mace broke, and Prahlada found himself growing helpless, and sought Vishnu's assistance. Vishnu told his devotee that the Nara-Narayana brothers were invincible as they were the sons of Yama, and could only be conquered in devotion rather than combat. The king left the regency to Andhaka and erected an ashrama to propitiate Nara-Narayana and apologise for his folly.

War against Vishnu 
According to the Kurma Purana, Prahlada always served thousands of Brahmins daily. One day, Prahlada forgot to serve one Brahmin inadvertently. The latter cursed the asura that he would forget Vishnu and become unrighteous. The curse soon came into fruition, with Prahlada ignoring the Vedas and the Brahmins, and was soon deviating from the path of dharma. Determined to avenge his father's death, he waged war against Vishnu. When he was defeated, he realised his folly and abdicated his throne, allowing Andhaka to reign as king.

Other conflicts 
According to the Devi Bhagavata Purana, Prahlada was compelled to wage war against Indra and the devas by the daityas. In the fierce devasura war that ensued, Prahlada emerged as the victor. Fearing that the asura king would destroy the devas, Indra prayed to Mahadevi, and Prahlada responded in kind. Pleased, the goddess pacificed both of them and they returned to their abodes.

Prahlada, Virochana, Bali, and Bana fought against Shiva and the devas when Andhaka attacked Kailasha. Prahlada had strongly advised Andhaka against the invasion, but Andhaka refused. Andhaka was eventually defeated by Shiva, and Prahlada once more became King of the Asuras.

Prahlada was present during the churning of the ocean and also fought in the Tarakamaya War against the devas.

Prahlada's son was Virochana, who was the father of Bali. The devas had Virochana killed by taking advantage of his generosity. Prahlada raised his grandson, Bali. Later on, Prahlada and Bali lived on Sutala Loka under the instructions of Vishnu.

It was Prahlada who asked Shukracharya to acquire the Mritasanjivani mantra from Shiva, to save the asuras from the devas.

After a long life, Prahlada attained Vaikuntha. Prahlada's great-grandson was the thousand-armed Banasura, who was humbled in battle by Krishna.

Pilgrimage sites
The following sites in Maharashtra, Andhra Pradesh, Telangana and Uttar Pradesh in India, are associated with Prahlāda or Narasiṁha as places of pilgrimage:
Prahlad Ghat, Hardoi
Shri Laxmi Narsimha Temple
Malakonda
Simhachalam
Ahobilam
Kadiri
Yadagirigutta Temple 
Lakshmi Narasimha swamy temple, Penna Ahobilam

In Pakistan:
Prahladpuri Temple, Multan

In dance
The Prahallada Nataka (also spelled as Prahlada-Naṭaka), a folk dance-theatre from Ganjam, Odisha enacts the story of Narasimha and Hiranyakashipu. This art form dates back to the 18th century when the Rāmakruṣṇa Chhoṭarāya, the erstwhile king of the Jalantara state wrote the text and the songs of the drama and started it.

In popular culture
The story of Prahlada has been the theme of various films.

See also 
 Kapila
 Narada
 Bhakti Yoga
 Jaya-Vijaya
 Narasimha
Hiranykashipu

References

Further reading

External links

 Prahlada in the Vishnu Purana

 Characters in the Bhagavata Purana
 Hindu monarchs
 Holi
 Vaishnavite religious leaders
 Salakapurusa
 Daityas
 Asura